is a mini album by Japanese Idol unit 3776 (Minanaro), released on December 28, 2014.

This is the first one for 3776 as solo unit of Chiyono Ide. Love Letter includes five songs, their instrumental versions, and the talk of Chiyono. The song  lasts over 20 minutes. It's unusual for Japanese idol song.
On April 22, 2017, Love Letter released as a 12-inch LP vinyl record.

Track listing
All tracks composed by Akira Ishida

A∩B

A∩B[Instrumental]

Personnel
Chiyono Ide - vocals
Akira Ishida - guitars, programming, etc.

References

2014 albums
Art pop albums
Pop albums by Japanese artists
Alternative rock albums by Japanese artists
Progressive rock albums by Japanese artists